Walter J. Gex III (March 29, 1939 – November 12, 2020) was a United States district judge of the United States District Court for the Southern District of Mississippi.

Education and career
Born in Bay St. Louis, Mississippi, Gex received a Bachelor of Arts degree from the University of Mississippi in 1962 and a Bachelor of Laws from the University of Mississippi Law School in 1963. He was in private practice in Jackson, Mississippi from 1963 to 1972, and then in Bay St. Louis from 1972 to 1986.

Federal judicial service
On January 29, 1986, Gex was nominated by President Ronald Reagan to a new seat on the United States District Court for the Southern District of Mississippi created by 98 Stat. 333. Gex was confirmed by the United States Senate on February 25, 1986, and received his commission on February 26, 1986. He assumed senior status on March 24, 2004.

Death
Gex died on November 12, 2020 in Diamondhead, Mississippi.

References

Sources
 

1939 births
2020 deaths
People from Bay St. Louis, Mississippi
Judges of the United States District Court for the Southern District of Mississippi
United States district court judges appointed by Ronald Reagan
20th-century American judges
University of Mississippi alumni
University of Mississippi School of Law alumni
21st-century American judges